Fort Vause (also known as "Fort Vass" or "Vass' Fort") was built in 1753 in Montgomery County, Virginia, by Ephraim Vause. The historic site is near the town of Shawsville, Virginia.

The original fort was built in 1753 to protect the Vause home and his neighbors. It was attacked by Shawnee warriors in 1756, and most of the inhabitants were killed or taken prisoner. Mary Draper Ingles, the wife of William Ingles, had a pre-sentiment that the fort would be attacked, and asked her husband to leave. They left just in time, for a few days later Fort Vause was attacked. John and Matthew Ingles, younger brothers of William, stayed at the fort. John is credited with shooting a scout from a tree, and Matthew with fighting hand to hand until his rifle broke, then fighting with a frying pan handle. He was taken prisoner by the Shawnee, but later was released or escaped, but died a few months later. His brother John, and his wife and children, were all killed at the fort.

A relief expedition led by Major Andrew Lewis arrived too late to aid the pioneers. An unknown number of settlers had been killed, and 150 were taken prisoner.

Afterwards, the fort was hastily re-built by Captain Peter Hogg in 1756 as an earth and palisade construction, and was inspected by George Washington later on that year as part of his tour of inspection of Southwestern Virginia.

Legacy
Fort Vause is a National Landmark, file #060-0017.

The Fort Vause Archaeological Site was established in 1968. The second fort has been identified, and part of the first fort. "The site is now on the property of the Hinshelwood family, and Sarah and Holly Hinshelwood are eighth-graders at Shawsville Middle School."

A recreation of the fort is at the Explore Park in Roanoke County, Virginia.

References

Colonial forts in Virginia
Vause
1756 establishments in the Thirteen Colonies
1756 establishments in Virginia
Archaeological sites on the National Register of Historic Places in Virginia